Nouihoum Kobenan (born 5 January 1985 in Parakou) is a Beninese retired football player who last played for Kotkan Työväen Palloilijat in Finland.

Career 
He began his career with Energie FC and signed in 2005 with Malien Premiere Division club AS Bamako, he won with the team also in his first season the Malien Cup. After two years with AS Bamako joined in Winter 2007 to League and city rival Djoliba AC, here won in his first season the league Malien Première Division.

In 2012, he moved to Finnish club Kotkan Työväen Palloilijat.

International 
Koubena began his career for his homeland Benin in 2006.

Honours 
 2005: Malien Cup
 2008: Malien Première Division

References

External links 
 

1985 births
Living people
Beninese footballers
Beninese expatriate sportspeople in Libya
Benin international footballers
AS Bamako players
Expatriate footballers in Libya
2010 Africa Cup of Nations players
Beninese expatriate sportspeople in Mali
Expatriate footballers in Mali
Djoliba AC players
People from Parakou
Energie FC players
Kotkan Työväen Palloilijat players

Association football midfielders